Paratore is a surname. Notable people with the surname include:

Anthony & Joseph Paratore, American classical piano duo of Anthony Paratore (born 1944) and Joseph Paratore (born 1948)
Ettore Paratore (1907–2000), Italian Latinist and academic
Giuseppe Paratore (1876–1967), Italian attorney and politician
Jim Paratore (1953–2012), American television producer
Renato Paratore (born 1996), Italian golfer